White's is a gentlemen's club in St James's, London.  Founded in 1693 as a hot chocolate shop in Mayfair, it is the oldest gentleman's club in London.  It moved to its current premises on St James's Street in 1778.

Status
White's is the oldest gentlemen's club in London, founded in 1693, and is considered by many to be the most exclusive private club in London.
Notable current members include Charles III, and the Prince of Wales. Former British Prime Minister David Cameron, whose father Ian Cameron had been the club's chairman, was a member for fifteen years but resigned in 2008, over the club's declining to admit women. 

White's continues to maintain its tradition as an establishment exclusively for gentlemen; brief exceptions were made for the visits by Queen Elizabeth II in 1991 and 2016. White's is a member of the Association of London Clubs.
In January 2018, calling themselves 'Women in Whites', a group of female protesters infiltrated the club to highlight its single-sex policy, one managing to gain entry by pretending to be a man. These persons were removed.

History
The club was originally established at 4 Chesterfield Street, off Curzon Street in Mayfair, in 1693 by an Italian immigrant named Francesco Bianco as a hot chocolate emporium under the name Mrs. White's Chocolate House. Tickets were sold to the productions at King's Theatre and Royal Drury Lane Theatre as a side-business. White's quickly made the transition from teashop to exclusive club and in the early 18th century, it was notorious as a gambling house; those who frequented it were known as "the gamesters of White's". The club gained a reputation for both its exclusivity and the often raffish behaviour of its members. Jonathan Swift referred to White's as the "bane of half the English nobility."

In 1778 it moved to 37–38 St James's Street. From 1783 it was the unofficial headquarters of the Tory party, while the Whigs' club Brooks's was just down the road. A few apolitical and affable gentlemen managed to belong to both. The new architecture featured a bow window on the ground floor. In the later 18th century, the table directly in front of it became a seat of distinction, the throne of the most socially influential men in the club. This belonged to the arbiter elegantiarum, Beau Brummell, until he removed to the Continent in 1816, when William Arden, 2nd Baron Alvanley, took the place of honour. While there, he is supposed to have once bet £3,000 on which of two raindrops would reach the bottom of a pane in the bow window. Later, the spot was reserved for the use of Arthur Wellesley, 1st Duke of Wellington, until his death in 1852.

Alvanley's was not the most eccentric bet in White's famous betting book. Some of those entries were on sports, but more often on political developments, especially during the chaotic years of the French Revolution and the Napoleonic Wars. A good many were social bets, such as whether a friend would marry this year, or to whom.

The club continues to maintain its tradition as a club for gentlemen only, although one of its best known chefs from the early 1900s was Rosa Lewis, a model for the central character in the BBC television series The Duchess of Duke Street.

There were two American members in the interwar period, one of whom was a general in the U.S. Army. Postwar American members included diplomat Edward Streator.

Charles III held his stag night at the club before his wedding to Diana Spencer in 1981. His eldest son, Prince William, was entered as a member of the club shortly after his birth.

Clubhouse
The clubhouse is located at 37–38 St James's Street in the City of Westminster and is a Grade I listed building. Originally built in 1674 and then rebuilt in 1787–88, probably by James Wyatt, it was further altered in 1811 and the frontage was remodelled by Lockyer in 1852. Constructed of Portland stone with a slate roof, it possesses the Victorian version of a Palladian façade with some French motifs. The building consists of five storeys; three principal floors of facilities for members, together with a basement and a dormered attic. In the late 1970s, the exterior was painted azure with white trim. This color scheme was not continued.

The club bar is more compact than those of many other clubs. A description of it, and of the rationale behind its size, may be found in chapter ten of the spy novel The Sixth Column (1951) by Peter Fleming, in which the club is thinly disguised as "Black's".

While the club does not have members' accommodation, facilities include a members' dining room, a billiards room, and several rooms (including the library and the cards room) where members may socialise, or hold private dinners. The club menu revolves around British game.

Notable members
George Canning (1794)
Norman Lamont, Baron Lamont of Lerwick (1942)
Adam Fleming (1948)
Major General Sir Stewart Menzies (1890–1968)
Nicholas Elliott

See also
 List of London's gentlemen's clubs
 List of gentlemen's clubs in the United States

References

Dod's Parliamentary Companion (various editions)
Debrett's People of Today, 2011

Further reading

External links
Architectural history, plans and elevations - from the Survey of London

Gentlemen's clubs in London
Regency London
1693 establishments in England
White's
Grade I listed buildings in the City of Westminster
Organizations established in 1693